The Southern States Wrestling (SSW) Appalachian Heavyweight Championship is a secondary professional wrestling tag team championship in Southern States Wrestling. It was first won by Beau James who defeated Tracey Smothers in a best-of-three matches in Meadowview, Virginia on May 11, 1996. The title is generally defended in the Southern United States, most often in its home base in East Tennessee, but has been defended in Virginia and West Virginia. There are 14 recognized champions with a total of 25 title reigns.

Title history

References

External links
Official Tag Team Championship Title History

  SSW Appalachian Championship

Regional professional wrestling championships